Miles Spencer (born April 30, 1963) is an American angel investor, media entrepreneur and explorer. He is best known for his role as co-host and co-creator of MoneyHunt, a reality-based show where entrepreneurs pitch their ideas to a panel of experts. MoneyHunt was distributed to PBS stations in the US beginning 1997 and overseas beginning 1999. Spencer and co-host Cliff Ennico are known for their direct, fast-paced questioning and constructive criticism of entrepreneurs. The two developed the program after a classroom experience at a local continuing education class. The show is considered the original program of the genre, and has been copied in several markets worldwide, most notably Dragons' Den and Shark Tank. Spencer, who was born in Norristown, PA, readily admits in his book MoneyHunt  to having been inspired by Enterprise, a French show hosted by Bernard Tapie, while he attended school there in the early eighties as an exchange student from Choate Rosemary Hall.

References

1963 births
Living people
American television personalities
Angel investors
Charity fundraisers (people)